Inagi, Tokyo held an election for the city assembly on April 15, 2007.

Results

See also

References

2007 elections in Japan
Inagi, Tokyo
April 2007 events in Japan
2007 in Tokyo